Vincenzo Bianco (2 August 1899 – 27 July 1975) was an Italian racing cyclist. He rode in the 1922 Tour de France.

References

1899 births
1975 deaths
Italian male cyclists
Place of birth missing